Marie Antoinette Murat,  (3 January 1793, Labastide-Murat, Lot, French Republic – 19 January 1847, Sigmaringen, Principality of Hohenzollern-Sigmaringen) was a member of the House of Murat. Through her marriage to Charles, Prince of Hohenzollern-Sigmaringen, Marie Antoinette was also a member of the House of Hohenzollern-Sigmaringen and Princess consort of Hohenzollern-Sigmaringen. Marie Antoinette was the niece of Joachim Murat, King of Naples from 1808 to 1815 and a brother-in-law of Napoleon Bonaparte, through marriage to Napoleon's youngest sister, Caroline Bonaparte.

Family

Marie Antoinette was a daughter of Pierre Murat, elder brother of Joachim Murat, King of the Two Sicilies (1748-1792) and his wife Louise d'Astorg (1762-1832).

Marriage and issue

Marie Antoinette married Charles, Hereditary Prince of Hohenzollern-Sigmaringen, eldest son of Anton Aloys, Prince of Hohenzollern-Sigmaringen and his wife Princess Amalie Zephyrine of Salm-Kyrburg, on 4 February 1808 in Paris. Marie Antoinette and Charles had four children:

Princess Annunziata Karoline Joachime Antoinette Amalie of Hohenzollern-Sigmaringen (6 June 1810 – 21 June 1885)
Karl Anton Joachim Zephyrinus Friedrich Meinrad, Prince of Hohenzollern-Sigmaringen (7 September 1811 – 2 June 1885)
Princess Amalie Antoinette Karoline Adrienne of Hohenzollern-Sigmaringen (30 April 1815 – 14 January 1841)
Princess Friederike Wilhelmine of Hohenzollern-Sigmaringen (24 March 1820 – 7 September 1906)

Ancestry

References

1793 births
1847 deaths
People from Cahors
Marie Antoinette
Princesses of Hohenzollern-Sigmaringen
Princesses Murat
French emigrants to Germany